Communist Party of Catalonia was the branch of the Communist Party of Spain in Catalonia. PCC was formed in 1932, substituting the Catalan-Balearic Communist Federation (FCCB). In 1936 PCC merged with other groups to form the Unified Socialist Party of Catalonia. At that time PCC had around 2000 members.

PCC published Catalunya Roja.

References

1932 establishments in Spain
1936 disestablishments in Spain
Defunct communist parties in Catalonia
Catalonia
Political parties disestablished in 1936
Political parties established in 1932